Zum Goldenen Anker is the oldest hotel in Lübeck, Germany founded in 1439.

The building has a historic heavy wooden door and the legend says there is still a study room of Pope Pius XII.

See also 
List of oldest companies

References

External links 
Homepage

Hotels in Germany
Restaurants in Germany
Companies established in the 15th century
15th-century establishments in the Holy Roman Empire